The Sacred Heart School
is a catholic primary and secondary school located in Golaghat, Assam, India.  It was established in 1959. The school consists of two separate entities, the Junior School and the High School, both with their own building but located at the same address, one next to the other.  The secondary school is affiliated to the Board of Secondary Education, Assam (SEBA), and it also conducts the High School Leaving Certificate examinations every year.

The school serves approximately 1,500 students, and has a teaching staff of about 50 professors and docents. It has one assembly ground, one play ground and one football ground. The school also has a computer laboratory and a library. It also has the  NCC (National Cadet Corps).

External links
  Sacred heart school Wikimapia
 Information on the school

Golaghat district
1886 establishments in India
Schools in Golaghat
1959 establishments in Assam
Catholic secondary schools in India
Educational institutions established in 1959
Christian schools in Assam